The 1983 World Archery Championships was the 32nd edition of the event. It was held in Los Angeles, United States on 19–22 October 1983 and was organised by World Archery Federation (FITA).

Medals summary

Recurve

Medals table

References

External links
 World Archery website
 Complete results

World Championship
World Archery
World Archery Championships
International archery competitions hosted by the United States